The Government of the Slovak Republic exercises executive authority in Slovakia. It is led by the Prime Minister of Slovakia, who is nominated by the President of Slovakia, and is usually the leader of majority party or of majority coalition after an election to the National Council of the Slovak Republic. The Cabinet appointed by the president on recommendation of the prime minister must gain a vote of confidence in the National Council.

Role and powers of the Government 

As the chief formulator of the nation's public policy under the Slovak Constitution, the Government has the authority to make major policy on the matters of national economy and social security. It is responsible for meeting the Government programme objectives within the scope of the adopted national budget. The main functions of the Government also include making proposals on the state budget, preparing the annual closing balance sheet, and issuing government regulations and decrees under power given to it by law. One of the Government's duties is the formulation and management of the nation's foreign policy. It submits draft Bills to the National Council (the Slovak parliament), which are frequently preceded by nationwide discussions and consultations with the relevant organizations. As established by law, the Government can discuss in its proceedings a confidence vote motion, cases of pardoning criminal offenders, and appointment or removal from office of senior civil servants.

Cabinet 
The Cabinet is made up of the Prime Minister, presiding over Deputies and Government Ministers. The Cabinet is appointed by the President of the Slovak Republic on the recommendation of the Prime Minister. For its policy and administration the members of the Cabinet are responsible to the National Council (the Slovak parliament).

Current cabinet 

Following the resignation of Prime Minister Igor Matovič, the current prime minister Eduard Heger has been serving with his government, since 1 April 2021. The cabinet fell when losing a no-confidence vote on December 15, 2022.

References

External links 
 Official site of the government

 
Politics of Slovakia
Political organisations based in Slovakia
Slovakia
Slovakia
European governments